1,3,5-Triaza-7-phosphaadamantane (PTA) is a chemical compound with the formula C6H12N3P, a product of the substitution of a nitrogen atom of hexamethylenetetramine with a phosphorus atom. It is soluble in water, methanol, trichloromethane, acetone, ethanol and DMSO, insoluble in hydrocarbon solvent.  As a reagent in organic synthesis, it is used as a ligand for transition metal complexes and as a catalyst for Baylis–Hillman reactions.

Preparation
Hexamethylenetetramine reacts with tetrakis(hydroxymethyl)phosphonium chloride, sodium hydroxide and formaldehyde in water to obtain the product.

See also
 RAPTA, a class of ruthenium complexes with the PTA ligand

References

Nitrogen heterocycles
Phosphorus heterocycles
Adamantane-like molecules